Kjosfossen is a waterfall located in Aurland Municipality in Vestland county, Norway. The waterfall is one of the most visited tourist attractions in Norway. There is a small power station on the waterfall which is used to power the Flåm Line railway.

The Flåm Line passes directly in front of and over the upper part of the waterfall (the falls continue much longer down to the right (east) of the Flåm Line as you head down into the gorge), which is one of the main attractions for tourists who take the Flåm Line.  (Some of the Flam tourist maps are orientated with South at the top.)

During the main tourist season in the summer an actress dressed as a legendary Huldra (a seductive forest creature in Scandinavian folklore) dances and sings in front of the waterfall as the trains enter the station for the amusement of the tourists. The Huldra actresses are all students from the Norwegian ballet school.

The waterfall gets as much as 900,000 visitors yearly, and is considered to be among Norway's most visited natural tourist attractions.

References

External links 
 
 Kjosfossen at visitnorway.com 
 Seeing Norway's Fjordlands by Bus, Train and Ferry Contains a sharp, close-up photograph of the 'fairy'

Waterfalls of Vestland
Aurland
Tourist attractions in Vestland